The family Thyatiridae comprises about 200 species, nine of which occur in Great Britain:

 Thyatira batis, peach blossom — throughout
 Habrosyne pyritoides, buff arches — south and centre
 Tethea ocularis octogesimea, figure of eighty — south and centre
 Tethea or, poplar lutestring
 Tethea or or — south (local)
 Tethea or scotica — north (local)
 Tetheella fluctuosa, satin lutestring — south-east and west (local)
 Ochropacha duplaris, common lutestring — throughout
 Cymatophorima diluta hartwiegi, oak lutestring — south and centre (local) (Vulnerable) ‡*
 Achlya flavicornis, yellow horned
 Achlya flavicornis galbanus — south and centre
 Achlya flavicornis scotica — north
 Polyploca ridens, frosted green — south (local)

Species listed in the 2007 UK Biodiversity Action Plan (BAP) are indicated by a double-dagger symbol (‡)—species so listed for research purposes only are also indicated with an asterisk (‡*).

See also
List of moths of Great Britain (overview)
Family lists: Hepialidae, Cossidae, Zygaenidae, Limacodidae, Sesiidae, Lasiocampidae, Saturniidae, Endromidae, Drepanidae, Thyatiridae, Geometridae, Sphingidae, Notodontidae, Thaumetopoeidae, Lymantriidae, Arctiidae, Ctenuchidae, Nolidae, Noctuidae and Micromoths

References 

 Waring, Paul, Martin Townsend and Richard Lewington (2003) Field Guide to the Moths of Great Britain and Ireland. British Wildlife Publishing, Hook, UK. .

Moths
Britain